Cryptanthus pseudopetiolatus is a plant species in the genus Cryptanthus. This species is endemic to Brazil.

References

pseudopetiolatus
Flora of Brazil